Eldar Rasimovich Abdulayev (born January 20, 1985) is a Kazakhstani  professional ice hockey forward currently playing for HC Astana in the Kazakhstan Hockey Championship. He was a member of the Kazakhstan men's national junior ice hockey team at the 2005 World Junior Ice Hockey Championships.

References

External links

1985 births
Sportspeople from Oskemen
HC Almaty players
HC Astana players
Kazakhstani ice hockey forwards
Kazzinc-Torpedo players
Living people
Yertis Pavlodar players